Chandrakant Singh (born 17 July 1974) is an Indian director and producer who has directed Hindi films such as Rama Rama Kya Hai Dramaaa. and Bin Bulaye Baraati. Be Careful, Main Zaroor Aaunga and the most recent film he has directed is Kya Masti Kya Dhoom which will due for release in 2019 .

Background
Born and brought up in Indore, Chandrakant Singh hails from Jodhpur, Rajasthan. His father was in the transportation business and his mother is a homemaker. His brother Abhay Singh is a film distributor. Chandrakant has a Graduation degree in Science - Biology from Devi Ahiliya University. He also did a 9 months course in scripting and direction from New York Film Academy in Los Angeles.

Filmography

References

External links
 
 
 
 
 https://web.archive.org/web/20190306213437/http://ckarts.in/

1974 births
Living people
Artists from Indore
20th-century Indian film directors
Hindi-language film directors
New York Film Academy alumni
Film directors from Madhya Pradesh
21st-century Indian film directors